Cape Brooks is a cape marked by steep, conspicuous walls which rise to , forming the south side of the entrance to New Bedford Inlet, on the east coast of Palmer Land. It was discovered and photographed from the air in December 1940 by members of the US Antarctic Service, and again photographed from the air in 1947 by members of the Ronne Antarctic Research Expedition, who in conjunction with the Falkland Islands Dependencies Survey (FIDS) also charted it from the ground. Cape Brooks was named by the FIDS for Charles E.P. Brooks, an English meteorologist on the staff of the Meteorological Office, from 1907 to 1949.

References
 

Headlands of Palmer Land